Compsa macra is a species of beetle in the family Cerambycidae. It was described by Thomson in 1867.

References

Neoibidionini
Beetles described in 1867